Cébazan (Languedocien: Cebasan) is a commune in the Hérault department in the south of France.

Population

See also
Communes of the Hérault department

References

Communes of Hérault